Lincoln Township is one of the thirteen townships of Sherman County, Kansas, United States.  The population was 95 at the 2000 census.

Geography
Located in the western part of the county, it borders the following townships:
Grant Township — north
Voltaire Township — northeastern corner
Logan Township — east
Smoky Township — southeast
McPherson Township — south
Stateline Township — west
It lies west of the county seat of Goodland.  There are no cities in the township, although the unincorporated community of Ruleton lies in the center of the township.

Intermittent headwaters of Beaver Creek, a tributary of the Republican River, flow through Lincoln Township.

Transportation
Interstate 70 and U.S. Route 24 travel east–west through Lincoln Township.  A railroad line also travels east–west through Lincoln Township, just north of the interstate.

Government
Lincoln Township is currently inactive; by Kansas law, when a township becomes inactive, its powers and duties revert to the county government.

References

External links
County website

Townships in Sherman County, Kansas
Townships in Kansas